Ozernaya is a river in the Kamchatka Krai of Russia, 
it originates in Lake Kurile and flows west to the Sea of Okhotsk. 

Despite the small area of its basin, the average annual discharge of water near the sea reaches . A significant amount of precipitation in this area provides a high flow of water in the river and is due both to the geographical location near the Pacific Ocean and to the mountainous orography of the basin. Its annual amount on Kurile Lake is 1400 mm and can significantly exceed this figure in mountainous areas. Precipitation mostly falls in the autumn and mostly in the form of snow in the mountains, which melts in the following summer without forming noticeable glaciers. 

The mountain landscape of the river basin has volcanic origin and called the Pauzhetsky volcano-caldera complex. Kurile Lake and the upper half of the Ozernaya channel lie within this volcanic region and the geothermal activity is often manifested here.

A distinctive feature of Ozernaya is the absence of ice cover in winter, the river freezes only in its mouth part. Because the river has a considerable geothermal underground inflow and has a steady fast current throughout its course, ice does not form during the cold season. The source of the river in the Kurile Lake also plays a role in this, since it provides the inflow of warmer water from the lake deeper layers, thus preventing ice formation in winter. In general, the combination of underground inflow and inflow from the lake leads to a smoothed river regime with high mean water levels in all seasons.

The abundance of geothermal resources in the region has its application at the oldest in Russia Pauzhetskaya geothermal power plant. It is located near the Pauzhetka river, one of its tributaries. 
The settlements of Ozernovsky and Zaporozhye are located near the mouth of the Ozernaya River and are centers of local fishing. There is also a Research Fisheries Center station on the river, it monitors the spawning of salmon and the development of its juveniles.

The specific nature of Ozernaya is preferable for some fish species. It has the biggest herd of sockeye salmon in the Pacific Asia and therefore has a special status in the Kamchatka-Kuril subzone.

See also
 List of rivers of Russia
 Kamchatka peninsula

References

Rivers of Kamchatka Krai
Drainage basins of the Sea of Okhotsk